In Memory of My Father is a 2005 film directed, written, and produced by Chris Jaymes starring Jeremy Sisto, Judy Greer, Christine Lakin, Matt Keeslar, Pat Healy, and Chris Jaymes. The film had its world premiere at the Cinevegas Film Festival in June 2005 winning the Best Film Award. The film was distributed by Sundance Channel and Scanbox Entertainment.[5] The music was done by Scottish band Belle & Sebastian.

Plot
A self-proclaimed (somewhat justifiably) film legend bribes his son to document his death under the unquestioning assumption that it will be historically important. The Result; In Memory of My Father, a twisted celebration of a Hollywood family narcissistically dealing with an eventfully frustrating day, regardless of the subtly distracting centerpiece which they're forced to endure; Dad's corpse.

Cast

Jeremy Sisto 
Judy Greer
Chris Jaymes
Christine Lakin
Christine Lakin
Pat Healy
Monet Mazur
Matt Keelsar
Eric Cole

Production
The film was constructed within a three month period from concept to wrap. Jaymes wrote the film based on a house that was once owned by Samuel Goldwyn and was available to use free of charge by an investor that put up approximately $35,000 to make the film. It was shot in 5 days. Post-production was completed in Vienna, Austria with Niki Klingohr's company Interspot Film.

Awards

2006 Santa Barbara International Film Festival – Best American Film/American Spirit Award
2006 Sonoma Valley Film Festival – Best Debut Feature
2006 Santa Cruz Film Festival – Director's Award
2005 CineVegas – Grand Jury Award
2005 San Diego Film Festival – Best Director
2005 AOF FEST – Best Picture
2005 Ft. Lauderdale International Film Festival – Spirit Award
2006 Lake Forest Film Fest – Grand Jury Award

Nominations
In Memory of My Father
2006 Atlanta Film Festival – Best Actor
2006 Marbella International Film Festival – Best Film
2005 NatFilm Copenhagen – Best Feature
2005 Starz Denver Int. Film Fest – Director to Watch – Chris Jaymes

References

External links

2005 films